Hudson's Bay Rewards (known as HBC Rewards before February 2013) is a loyalty program where customers earn points for purchases at The Bay stores and websites in Canada.

Every 2000 points earned can be redeemed for a $10 gift card.  Hudson's Bay also allows the points to be converted to Air Miles (one mile per 40 points converted).  A third-party service, Points.com, adds additional conversion options for Hudson's Bay Rewards points.

History

1980s and 1990s: Club Z and Air Miles 
The rewards program was first introduced by Zellers in 1986.  It was known as Club Z and awarded points to customers. Starting in the 1990s, The Bay offered Air Miles reward miles to their customers as a rewards program.

2000s: HBC Rewards launched 
In an effort to offer more choices to customers at both Zellers and the Bay, and with the opening of its Home Outfitters chain, the HBC Rewards program was introduced in April 2001.  Club Z points were automatically converted to the same amount in HBC Rewards points.

2010s: Zellers closure and Hudson's Bay Rewards rebranding 
In 2010 and 2013, all but three Zellers locations across Canada shuttered, to be replaced by Target, Walmart or other retailers.  Points could still be earned at Zellers during the stores' liquidations, and the HBC stated that its Rewards program would continue to exist at the Bay and Home Outfitters.

In 2013, HBC relaunched HBC rewards under a new name, Hudson's Bay Rewards.  Their new program is complemented by a NewRewards.ca website.

References

Hudson's Bay Company
Customer loyalty programs in Canada